The top tier in English football today is the Premier League, replacing the Football League Division 1 for the 1992–1993 inaugural season. Since the 1888–89 season, the first year of top flight football, 109 different individual players have been named top scorer. Players from Tottenham Hotspur have been named top scorer more than players from any other club, appearing 13 times on this list. 18 different nationalities are represented and although the vast majority of players are English, there were 16 times where the top scorer in the First Division was Scottish. Since the Premier League started, the player (or players) is awarded the Golden Boot Trophy, for the most league goals in the season. In the Premier League era, Thierry Henry has won the Golden Boot more times than anyone else, winning this accolade four times, all with Arsenal. Wayne Rooney, the Premier League's second highest goal scorer, does not appear on this list at all.

Once a rarity, a more widespread assortment of nationalities has achieved this success in recent years, in the 2018–19 season, it was shared between three players from different African countries, then in the 2021–22 season Son Heung-min from South Korea, finished level with Egypt's Mohamed Salah. Since the turn of the millennium only three Englishmen have won the award. In the 1999–2000 season Kevin Phillips won with 30 goals for Sunderland. Tottenham’s Harry Kane won the golden boot in successive seasons when he scored 25 in 2015–16 and then 29 in the 2016–17 season. He won it again in the 2020–21 season. The third is Jamie Vardy, the Leicester City striker scored 23 goals in the 2019–20 season.

Top Scorers

By season

On six occasions Jimmy Greaves was the league top scorer, twice with Chelsea and later four with Tottenham, however Steve Bloomer with 5 holds the record for one team. Thierry Henry is the record Premier League winner with 4. Gary Lineker has won the honour three times, all with different clubs, the only player to do so.

In the 1951–52 season, Chile international Jorge ‘George’ Robledo became the first foreign player to score the most goals in a season, topping the list with 33 goals for Newcastle United. He stood alone on this list for 47 years. For two consecutive years the award was won by the lowest total of goals ever, 18. Englishmen Michael Owen, Dion Dublin and Chris Sutton won in the 97–98 season. Owen again won in the 98–99 season, but this time he was joined by Dutchman Jimmy Floyd Hasselbaink and Dwight Yorke, Trinidad & Tobago, the duo becoming the first foreign league top scorers since Robledo. Didier Drogba (Ivory Coast) became the first African to win the award in 2006–07 season and later Carlos Tevez, Luis Suarez and Sergio Aguero would add to the South American winners. In 2018–19, two players from the same club both finished as top scorers for the first time, Sadio Mané, Senegal, and Mohamed Salah, Egypt, of Liverpool. finished in another three way tie, joined by Pierre Emerick Aubameyang, Gabon. Last season saw Son Heung Min become the first Asian winner, the South Korean scored 23 goals to finish level with Mohamed Salah.

From the start of the Premier League, a golden boot trophy is presented to the top goalscorer. The first player to win this trophy was Teddy Sheringham, then playing for Tottenham Hotspur. In the 1993–94 season Andy Cole scored 34 goals for Newcastle United, the highest number of goals in the Premier League era to win the award. The following season Alan Shearer equaled it while playing for Blackburn Rovers. Both these seasons were over a 42 match season, 22 teams back then. Since the Premier League was reduced to 20 teams, Mohamed Salah holds the record with 32 in a 38 match season. However all these totals are dwarfed by the all time record holder, Everton legend Dixie Dean, who still holds the record for the most goals in a season with 60, set in the 1927–28 season.

By number of seasons as top scorer 

Bold shows players currently playing in the Premier League.
Italics show players still playing professional football.

By club
Coventry City and Stoke City are the only clubs with top league scorers whose teams have never finished in the top three.

By nationality

Top 50 All-time Top Scorers 

The Football League Division One from 1888 through to the end of the 1991–92 season and now the Premier League, make up the top tier in English football. During these 135 years three players have scored over 300 goals, with another 25 scoring over 200 goals. A further three players were a goal shy, finishing on 199 goals. The first was Sheffield Wednesday’s Andrew Wilson whose career was interrupted by World War I but went onto make 501 appearances. In the mid-sixties, Bobby Smith retired after scoring 23 in 74 for Chelsea and 176 in 271 for Tottenham, and finally ten years later, England legend Sir Bobby Charlton, left Manchester United after making 606 appearances.

Derby County forward Steve Bloomer was the first player to score over 300 goals, his record of 314 stood for over half a century. In 14 years, he scored 240 goals in 376 matches in his first stint at Derby County before moving to Middlesbrough where he scored 59 in 125 games for the Boro. After five years on Teesside, he returned to Derby who were in the second division then. He spent two years in the second division scoring 38 goals before the Rams won promotion. In his final two seasons he scored a further 15 goals in 34 matches, a total of 255 in 410 appearances for Derby County. Everton striker Dixie Dean came very close to breaking the record, he scored 349 league goals all for Everton, however 39 were scored in the second division, leaving him 4 goals behind. Bloomers’ achievement was finally surpassed when Jimmy Greaves broke the record scoring 357 goals, playing for Chelsea, Tottenham Hotspur and West Ham United. For Chelsea he scored 124 goals in 157 appearances, only Frank Lampard 147, Roy Bentley 130, and Bobby Tambling 129 have scored more top flight goals for Chelsea. Greaves moved on to Tottenham Hotspur where, to this day, remains Tottenham’s top league goalscorer after scoring 220 goals in 321 appearances. His top flight career ended at West Ham United, where he scored 13 in 38 matches.

In the Premier League era, Alan Shearer sits top, but even with his full tally of 283 goals, he is still left trailing. Four more “modern day” players, who have played in the Premier League make the list, Wayne Rooney, the second highest Premier League goalscorer with 208 goals for Everton and Manchester United, is 22nd. Liverpool legend Ian Rush is the 14th highest scorer in the history of top flight football, but his Premier League tally is only 48 goals, ranking him 130. Another player to lose goals is Tony Cottee, who sits in 18th place. His last 78 goals gives him a current PL ranking of 58. Apart from these three, a further 20 players, who have scored 100 or more goals, have lesser totals. Ranked 44th, Lee Chapman scored 177 goals, the same as Frank Lampard and two more than Thierry Henry, but his last 23 goals sees him in 314th place in the Premier League. Peter Beardsley and Matt Le Tissier (ranked 71 and 72 respectively), both scored 161 goals, 11 more than Michael Owen who is tenth on the PL list. Beardsley is in 88th position with 58 goals in the Premier League while a lack of centurions, assists Le Tissier’s ranking. Losing 61 goals improves his overall position, ranked 33rd in the Premier League with 100 goals. 

The current top active player is Tottenham Hotspur striker Harry Kane, whose goal tally is now 204, ranking him third in the Premier League. Kane this season has overtaken such players as Dennis Viollet, Ray Charnley who both had 190 goals, Peter Harris, who scored 192 goals for Portsmouth, Stan Mortensen who scored 197 goals for Blackpool, George Elliott who scored 198 goals for Middlesbrough and the three players mentioned above who all scored 199 goals. Kane, currently ranked 24th, is only the 28th player in 135 years of league football to join the elite 200 club.

First Division/Premier League Top 50 Goalscorers.

As shown below in the player records, Lee Chapman holds the record of most top flight clubs scored for with 8. Andy Cole played for 8 clubs also, but only scored for 6. Marcus Bent is another player to play for 8 different top flight clubs, again only scoring for 6. Steve Claridge has played for sixteen different league clubs, but only with Leicester City has he played in the top division, scoring 12 in 49 appearances. A name that does not appear on the top scorer list is Arthur Rowley, the record holder for the most goals in league football, scoring 434 goals in 619 league games. Arthur's brother Jack Rowley scored 173 goals for Manchester United and is ranked 49th, shown above. Arthur however didn't play much top flight football in his career, but he did score 51 goals in 95 matches. In one season at Fulham he scored 8 in 34 appearances and then later hit 43 in 61 appearances over two seasons for Leicester City.

Clubs top scorer in top tier 

The start of the Football League saw 12 teams become the founding members of the first ever league season in 1888–89. These were Accrington, Blackburn Rovers, Bolton Wanderers, Burnley, Everton, Preston North End, Aston Villa, Derby County, Notts County, Stoke City, West Bromwich Albion and Wolverhampton Wanderers. Since then a total of sixty five different clubs have played at the top level, with only three premier league players breaking club records set in the football league. Thierry Henry beat the 150 scored by Cliff Bastin for Arsenal. Roy Bentley who scored 130 goals for Chelsea was surpassed by Frank Lampard, while Sergio Aguero overtook the 147 Eric Brook scored for Manchester City. Matt Le Tissier scored in both the First Division and the Premier League to become Southampton’s top scorer, exceeding the 134 goal record set by Welshman Ron Davies. The Premier League’s top two goalscorers, who both scored over 200 goals, fail to appear. Alan Shearer finished nine goals adrift of Blackburn’s Ted Harper and finished two short of Geordie legend Jackie Milburn, while Wayne Rooney was sixteen short of Bobby Charlton’s record. Crystal Palace are the only club whose top scorer is still currently playing, Wilfried Zaha so far has 67 goals to his name.

Glossop statistics currently unavailable.

Top five scorers by nationality 

Many different nationalities have played in English top flight football throughout the years. The tables below show the top five highest scorers from their respective country. As shown in the list above, the top English and Scottish goal scorers can be seen. Apart from English players, the Republic of Ireland top scorers' features Robbie Keane, who is the only home nations player to score all his goals in the Premier League, as Niall Quinn and Mark Hughes both scored nearly half their goals in either Division 1 or the Premier League.

Of the home nation countries, Premier League players are well short of the overall records. Northern Ireland's top Premier League scorer is Iain Dowie who scored 33 of his 57 goals in the Premier League. After Keane the top Irish Republic scorer is Shane Long, who managed 56 goals. The top Welsh goal scorer is Ryan Giggs who scored 114 goals, 109 in the Premier League while Duncan Ferguson with 68 goals is the top Scottish goal scorer in the Premier League. A different story with the rest of the world, made up predominately of Premier League players only. South American Jorge Robledo’s record remains from the fifties, currently the third highest goalscorer. Craig Johnston has been overtaking by Premier League Oceanic players while Lindy Delapenha also, has lost his Caribbean record. However, South African duo Stuart Leary and Berry Nieuwenhuys records remain intact from decades ago. American Roy Wegerle has dropped to second in the USA & Canada scorers. The European and African top scorers are all from the Premier League era.

Riyad Mahrez who currently has 82 goals, is the closest African to Yakubu, 95.

Gabriel Jesus who currently has 63 goals, is the closest South American to Luis Suarez, 69.       

As of 19th March 2023       

 Bold shows players currently playing in the Premier League. 

Northern Ireland

Republic of Ireland 

Wales 

Europe (excluding UK)

South America

Africa

Oceania

U.S.A & Canada

Caribbean

South Africa

Central America

Asia

Forgotten Centurions 

Twenty four players who played either side of the 1992 rebranding of the top tier in English football, scored a century of goals in their careers. However, 17 of these players would make up the last group to join the list of forgotten centurions. A total of 255 players, during the 135 year history of football in England, have scored 100 or more goals in the top flight. Son Heung-Min will soon make it 256, who currently has 99 goals, all for Tottenham. That figure includes the 33 players in the Premier League 100 club. Of those 33, 7 players had scored previously in the first division before 1992, losing goals but still keeping enough to remain in the Premier League’s history. The other 17 players, who all scored over 100 goals shown in the table below, will never be seen among the easily available Premier League records. Football was not invented in 1992, but every record shown on Sky Sports is only since then, meaning 104 years of records ignored, including the other 222 players who have all scored 100 or more goals, all those records not as easily, or readily available.

Not every player is as lucky as Matt Le Tissier, losing 61 goals moves him up to 33rd in the Premier League. The career of Manchester United stalwart Bryan Robson is very nearly entirely erased, the same with Alan Smith, the Leicester City and Arsenal striker. John Wark, the Ipswich Town and Liverpool midfielder scored 135 goals, which would make him the 14th highest goal scorer in the Premier League. The Scottish midfielder is ahead of Paul Scholes and Steven Gerrard while Robson would be sitting alongside Dion Dublin and Sadio Mané, just outside the top 20. Many other player records also fail to show their full career statistics because of the changeover. These include Manchester United forward Brian McClair who lost 70 of his 88 goals. Paul Goddard scored 82 goals but is shot down to only 3 while England midfielder Steve Hodge has 3 goals also, not his full 79. Gary Bannister also lost 70 goals, 78 reduced to 8 goals. Former England left back Stuart Pearce is shown with 20 goals and not the 63 he scored, mostly at Nottingham Forest. David Platt does not have his 45 goals he scored for Aston Villa included, only the 13 he scored for Arsenal. Chris Waddle loses his entire career records for both Newcastle United and Tottenham Hotspur, his 10 goals for Sheffield Wednesday and his solitary Sunderland goal are all that's included.

17 players who all scored 100 or more goals, scoring in both Division 1 & Premier League

Total Goals of players included in the Premier League 100 club

Player Records 
All records listed below pertain to league matches played in Division 1 and/or the Premier League only.

Most goals: 357 - Jimmy Greaves in 516 matches for Chelsea, Tottenham Hotspur and West Ham United (1957-1971)

Most goals in a season:

 42 matches – 60 Dixie Dean, Everton 1927–28

 38 matches – 32 Mohamed Salah, Liverpool 2017–18

Most goals in a debut season:

 42 matches – 38 Dave Halliday, Sunderland 1925–26

 38 matches – 30 Kevin Phillips, Sunderland 1999–2000 (Erling Haaland, Manchester City, has currently scored 28 goals)

Most goals in a match: 7 Ted Drake for Arsenal v Aston Villa (away) 14 December 1935

Most hat-tricks: 30 Dixie Dean Everton 1923–1937

Most hat-tricks in one season: 8 Dixie Dean 1931-32

Youngest goalscorer: Jason Dozzell 16 years and 57 days for Ipswich Town v Coventry City, February 1984)

Youngest hat-trick goalscorer: Alan Shearer 17yrs 240 days for Southampton v Arsenal April 8, 1988. (Trevor Francis 16 years and 317 days was in Division 2)

Oldest goalscorer: Billy Meredith, 47 years, 8 months, 17 days. Manchester City v Burnley (a) April 15, 1922. Also FA Cup oldest goalscorer, aged 49.

Most consecutive league matches scored in: 15 Stan Mortensen, Blackpool 1950-51

Most clubs scored for: 8 Lee Chapman (Stoke City, Sheffield Wed. Leeds Utd, Arsenal, Sunderland, Nott'm Forest, West Ham Utd, Ipswich Town)

Consecutive Hat-tricks: 3 

 Frank Osborne, Tottenham Hotspur 1925 v Liverpool, Leicester City, West Ham United
 Tom Jennings, Leeds United 1926 v Arsenal, Liverpool (4), Blackburn Rovers
 Dixie Dean, Everton 1927/28 1928/29 v Burnley (4), Arsenal, Bolton Wanderers (2 end of season,1 opening day of new season)
 Jack Balmer, Liverpool 1946 v Portsmouth, Derby County (4), Arsenal

Most hat-tricks for one team in a match: 3 Alf Spouncer, Enoch West and Bill Hooper Nott'm Forest, in their record breaking 12-0 home win over Leicester City on April 21, 1909.

Most Penalties scored in 1 season: 13 Francis Lee, Manchester City 1971/72

Hat-trick of Penalties: 

 Billy Walker for Aston Villa v Bradford City in 1921.

 Charlie Mitten for Manchester United v Aston Villa in 1950.

 Ken Barnes for Manchester City v Everton in 1957.

Most own goals in one season: 5 Bobby Stuart (Middlesbrough 1934–35)

Fastest goal by a substitute: 6 seconds, Nicklas Bendtner for Arsenal v Tottenham Hotspur, 22 December 2007)

Most consecutive Top Scorer awards: 3

 Jimmy Greaves (1963, 1964, 1965)

 Alan Shearer (1995, 1996, 1997)

 Thierry Henry (2004, 2005, 2006)

Most Top Scorer awards with different clubs: 3 Gary Lineker (Leicester City 1985, Everton 1986, Tottenham Hotspur 1990)

Fastest player to reach 100 goals: Dave Halliday in 101 games for Sunderland.

Players to score over 30 league goals in four consecutive seasons: Dave Halliday, 1925–26 to 1928–29. Halliday scored at least 35 goals in each of those four seasons.

Most league appearances: Peter Shilton 849 (1966 to 1997)

Most league appearances by an outfield player: John Hollins 714 (1963-1983) (62 goals - Chelsea 47, Q.P.R 6, Arsenal 9)

Most league appearances at one club: Ryan Giggs 672 for Manchester United, 2 March 1991 to 6 May 2014)

Most titles won by an individual player: 13 Ryan Giggs

Team Goals

Most goals scored in total: 7,183 Everton in 4,660 matches. (Liverpool 7,162 in 4,274)

Most goals scored in a season:

 42 matches - 128 Aston Villa 1930–31 Top scorers, Tom 'Pongo' Waring 49, Eric Houghton 30. (8 other scorers)  Arsenal scored 127 in same season.

 38 matches - 106 Manchester City 2017–18 Top Scorer, Sergio Aguero 21. (12 other scorers)

See also
Football records and statistics in England
List of footballers in England by number of league goals
Premier League Golden Boot
List of footballers with 100 or more Premier League goals

Notes

References

goal
Football League First Division
England 1 First
England 1 First
Association football player non-biographical articles
Football records and statistics in England